Chrysochlorolaelaps is a genus of mites in the family Laelapidae.

Species
 Chrysochlorolaelaps benoiti Evans & Till, 1966

References

Laelapidae